The 2018 Iranian Super Cup was the 4th Iranian Super Cup, scheduled to be played on July 20, 2018, between the 2017–18 Persian Gulf Pro League champions Persepolis and the 2017–18 Hazfi Cup champions Esteghlal. The result of match awarded 3-0 in favor of  Persepolis, because of Esteghlal match withdrawal.

Match

References

Iranian Super Cup
Persepolis F.C. matches
2018
Esteghlal F.C. matches